Kazem Hassibi (Hasibi) (born Tehran, October 1906 – died Tehran, October 28, 1990) was an Iranian academic, parliamentarian, National Front leader, and oil adviser to Prime Minister Mohammad Mosaddegh during Iran's oil nationalization movement.

After his education in France, Hassibi served a stint in the military. In 1941, he began teaching at the University of Tehran in the Faculty of Engineering and also co-founded the Engineer's Association (Kānun-e mohandesin), which would eventually become the Iran Party (Ḥezb-e Irān) and merge into the National Front (Jebhe Melli Irân). Politically active on issues related to oil, he became Deputy Minister of Finance under Mosaddegh and, in 1951, a member of the House of Parliament. During this time, he was regarded as the chief oil expert in Iran. He was a strong proponent of nationalization of the Anglo-Iranian Oil Company and refused to take part in the mediation talks between Iran and the British led by W. Averell Harriman in Terhan in July 1951. He did take part in those spearheaded by Richard Stokes the following month. After the 1953 Iranian coup d'état unseated Mosaddegh, Hassibi was imprisoned along with other important members of the National Front. After his release, he remained politically active with the National Front.

Kazem Hassibi is the grandfather of famous polymath Babak Hassibi. Kazem's father was a watchmaker/clocksmith, and craftsman of other time keeping devices and/or scientific instruments in Tehran, Iran during the late 19th century.

References

National Front (Iran) MPs
20th-century Iranian engineers
1906 births
1990 deaths
Iran Party politicians
Members of the 17th Iranian Majlis